Matheus Pucinelli de Almeida and Thiago Agustín Tirante won the boys' doubles tennis title at the 2019 French Open, defeating Flavio Cobolli and Dominic Stricker in the final, 7–6(7–3), 6–4.

Ondřej Štyler and Naoki Tajima were the defending champions, but both players were no longer eligible to participate in junior tournaments.

Seeds

Draw

Finals

Top half

Bottom half

External links 
 Draw

Boys' Doubles
2019